Keegan is an Anglicisation of the Irish clan name Mac Aodhagáin, now often used as a forename. The name means "son (or descendant) of Aodhagán" (a diminutive of the Irish name Aodh, meaning "fire" or "fiery"). In North America the name is most often given to boys, but has gradually become unisex.

Notable people with the given name "Keegan" include

A
Keegan Akin (born 1995), American baseball player
Keegan Allen (born 1989), American actor

B
Keegan Bradley (born 1986), American golfer
Keegan Brooksby (born 1990), Australian rules footballer 
Keegan Brown (born 1992), English darts player

C
Keegan Cook (born 1985), American volleyball coach

D
Keegan Daniel (born 1985), South African rugby player
Keegan de Lancie (born 1984), American actor
Keegan DeWitt (born 1982), American singer-songwriter

G
Keegan Gerhard (born 1969), American pastry chef

H
Keegan Hall (born 1983), American artist
Keegan Hartley (born 2004), English footballer
Keegan Hipgrave (born 1997), Australian rugby league footballer
Keegan Hirst (born 1988), British rugby league footballer

J
Keegan Jelacic (born 2002), New Zealand-Australian footballer 
Keegan Joyce (born 1989), Australian actor and singer

K
Keegan-Michael Key (born 1971), American actor
Keegan Kolesar (born 1997), Canadian ice hockey player
Keegan Kuhn, American filmmaker

L
Keegan Lester, American poet
Keegan Linderboom (born 1989), New Zealand professional footballer
Keegan Longueira (born 1991), South African author
Keegan Lowe (born 1993), American-Canadian ice hockey player

M
Keegan McHargue (born 1982), American artist
Keegan Messing (born 1992), Canadian-American figure skater
Keegan Meth (born 1988), Zimbabwean cricketer
Keegan Meyer (born 1997), American soccer player
Keegan Murray (born 2000), American basketball player

N
Keegan Nash (born 1986), Australian soccer player

O
Keegan Oates (born 2000), Australian cricketer
Keegan O'Toole (born 2001), American wrestler

P
Keegan Palmer (born 2003), Australian skateboarder
Keegan Pereira (disambiguation), multiple people
Keegan Petersen (born 1993), South African cricketer
Keegan Phiri (born 1983), Zambian footballer

R
Keegan Ritchie (born 1990), South African footballer
Keegan Rosenberry (born 1993), American soccer player

S
Keegan Smith (disambiguation), multiple people
Keegan Soehn (born 1992), Canadian gymnast
Keegan Swenson (born 1994), American cyclist
Keegan Swirbul (born 1995), American cyclist

T
Keegan Taylor (1984–2013), Zimbabwean cricketer
Keegan Thompson (born 1995), American baseball player
Keegan Connor Tracy (born 1971), Canadian actress and author

Fictional characters 
Keegan Butcher-Baker, character in the BBC soap opera EastEnders

See also
Keegan (surname), people with the surname "Keegan"